Kevin Popović (born July 4, 1964) is an American communications author, educator, and entrepreneur. He is the founder and CEO Ideahaus and Market Ready Index. Popović also serves as the Director of Idea Lab, part of the Zahn Innovation Platform at San Diego State University.

Popović has written books focusing on communications and engagement, including Satellite Marketing: Using Social Media to Create Engagement (2016) and 20 Years Communications: 20 Leaders 20 Questions, 100s of Lessons (2013).

Early life

Popović was born on July 4, 1964 in Pittsburgh, Pennsylvania. He graduated from Quigley High School in 1982. In 1987, Popović graduated from Pittsburgh's Duquesne University with a Bachelor of Arts in Communications and Psychology.

Career
Popović began teaching at San Diego State University (SDSU) in 2014 with a Social Media Strategy course through the College of Extended Studies. In 2015, he began teaching Creativity & Innovation in the College of Business.

In 2015, Popović founded Market Ready Index, "a disruptive marketing technology platform focused on optimizing performance across all channels of communications."

Bibliography

Books
 Satellite Marketing: Using Social Media To Create Engagement published on May 24, 2016, by Productivity Press 
 20Years Communications: 20 Leaders, 20 Questions, 100's of Lessons published on June 23, 2013, by Transmedia Publishing
 Creating Engagement in the Classroom: Understanding the Challenges of the Modern Learning Environment
 A View From The Top: The Evolution of Marketing and the Customer Journey

Other publications
 Popović, K., Smith, D. C., Hellebusch, S. J. (2013). Attitudes on the use of social media in healthcare communications. Journal of Communication in Healthcare, Vol. 6 (1), 22–28.
 Popović, K, & Smith, C. (2010, Vol. 3, No. 2). Tweeting @DoctorWelby: Practical Examples of Social Media in Healthcare. Journal of Communication in Healthcare. (pp. 138–151)  W. S. Maney & Sons Ltd 2010

References

1964 births
Living people
American chief executives
American male writers
Duquesne University alumni
San Diego State University faculty